

Vivekananda Kendra is a Hindu nationalist social service and "nation-building" organisation, claiming to represent the heritage of Swami Vivekananda. Closely affiliated with Rashtriya Swayamsevak Sangh, the organisation is based near the Vivekananda Rock Memorial in Kanyakumari.

The organisation was founded on 7 January 1972 by Eknath Ranade, a senior pracharak of the Rashtriya Swayamsevak Sangh. Its current president is A. Balakrishnan.

The organisation has constructed a solid waste management and bio-gas plant in Mahabalipuram.

Vivekananda Kendra received the Gandhi Peace Prize for 2015 for its contribution to rural development, education and development of natural resources.

See also
Rashtriya Swayamsevak Sangh

References

Further reading

External links

Sangh Parivar
Education in Tamil Nadu
Education in Arunachal Pradesh
Educational organisations based in India
Recipients of the Gandhi Peace Prize